Associative memory may refer to:

 Associative memory (psychology), the ability to learn and remember the relationship between unrelated items
 Associative storage, or content-addressable memory, a type of computer memory used in certain very high speed searching applications
 Autoassociative memory, all computer memories that enable one to retrieve a piece of data from only a tiny sample of itself
 Bidirectional associative memory, a type of recurrent neural network
 Hopfield network, a form of recurrent artificial neural network
 Transderivational search in psychology or cybernetics, a search for a fuzzy match across a broad field